Josip Kujundžić (born 1916, date of death unknown) was a Yugoslav gymnast. He competed in eight events at the 1948 Summer Olympics.

References

1916 births
Year of death missing
Yugoslav male artistic gymnasts
Olympic gymnasts of Yugoslavia
Gymnasts at the 1948 Summer Olympics
Place of birth missing